Ephialtias monilis is a moth of the  family Notodontidae. It is widespread in upper Amazonia and the Guianas in South America, including Peru.

External links
Species page at Tree of Life project

Notodontidae of South America
Moths described in 1806